Liam O'Donoghue (born 21 July 1952 in Mungret, County Limerick, Ireland) is an Irish retired sportsperson.  He played hurling with his local club Mungret/St. Paul's and was a member of the Limerick senior inter-county team in the 1970s and 1980s.

References 

1952 births
Living people
Mungret hurlers
Limerick inter-county hurlers
Munster inter-provincial hurlers
Hurling selectors
All-Ireland Senior Hurling Championship winners